Ragda may refer to:

Ragda pattice, popular Indian snack 
Ragda, Nepal